A general election was held in the U.S. state of Louisiana on October 12, 2019 with a runoff on November 16, 2019 for races in which no candidate was able to secure an absolute majority. Louisiana is the only state that has a jungle primary system (California and Washington have a similar top two primary system).

Governor

Incumbent Democratic Governor John Bel Edwards was re-elected for a second term in office.

Lieutenant Governor

Incumbent Republican Lieutenant Governor Billy Nungesser was re-elected for a second term in office.

Attorney General

Incumbent Republican Attorney General Jeff Landry was re-elected for a second term in office.

Secretary of State

Candidates

Republican Party
Kyle Ardoin, incumbent Louisiana Secretary of State
Thomas Kennedy III, candidate for Louisiana Secretary of State in 2018
Amanda Smith, paralegal

Democratic Party
Gwen Collins-Greenup, candidate for Louisiana Secretary of State in 2018

General election

Results

Runoff

Polling

Results

State Treasurer

Candidates

Republican Party
John Schroder, incumbent Louisiana State Treasurer

Democratic Party
Derrick Edwards, attorney and candidate for Louisiana State Treasurer in 2017

Independents
Teresa Kenny, entrepreneur

General election

Results

Commissioner of Agriculture and Forestry

Candidates

Republican Party
Michael Strain, incumbent Louisiana Agriculture and Forestry Commissioner
Bradley Zaunbrecher, cattle farmer

Democratic Party
Marguerite Green, executive director of SPROUT NOLA
Charlie Greer, former forestry enforcement agent and candidate for Louisiana Commissioner of Agriculture and Forestry in 2015
Peter Williams, tree farmer

General election

Results

Commissioner of Insurance

Candidates

Republican Party
Jim Donelon, incumbent Louisiana Insurance Commissioner
Tim Temple, businessman

Polling

General election

Results

Louisiana State Legislature
Republicans gained a 2/3 majority in the State Senate, but in the State House, Democratic challenger Mack Cormier flipped HD 105 and independent Roy Daryl Adams retained his seat in HD 62, blocking the Republicans from gaining a supermajority and allowing John Bel Edwards to veto bills passed by the Legislature.

Notes

References

External links
Official campaign websites for Secretary of State
 Kyle Ardoin (R) for Secretary of State
 Gwen Collins-Greenup (D) for Secretary of State
 Thomas Kennedy III (R) for Secretary of State 
 Amanda Smith (R) for Secretary of State 

Official campaign websites for Treasurer
 Derrick Edwards (D) for Treasurer
 Teresa Kenny (I) for Treasurer
 John Schroder (R) for Treasurer

Official campaign websites for Commissioner of Agriculture and Forestry
 Marguerite Green (D) for Ag Commissioner
 Charlie Greer (D) for Ag Commissioner
 Mike Strain (R) for Ag Commissioner
 Peter Williams (D) for Ag Commissioner 

Official campaign websites for Commissioner of Insurance
 Jim Donelon (R) for Insurance Commissioner
 Tim Temple (R) for Insurance Commissioner

 
Louisiana